The 2015 Jubilee Trophy is the national championship for women's soccer clubs competing at division 4 and below in the Canadian soccer pyramid. It was held in Calgary, Alberta from October 8–12, 2015.

Teams 
Eight teams were granted entry into the competition; one from each Canadian province excluding New Brunswick and Prince Edward Island.

Teams were selected by their provincial soccer associations; most often qualifying by winning provincial leagues or cup championships such as the Ontario Cup.

Group stage
The eight teams in the competition were divided into two groups of four teams each, which then play a single-game round-robin format.  At the end of group play, each team faces the equal-ranked team from the other group to determine a final seeding for the tournament.

Group A

Group B

Final round
The final round consists of one game for each club, where they are paired with their equal-ranked opponent from the opposite group to determine a final ranking for the tournament.

Tournament Ranking

References

External links 
 Canadian Soccer Association National Championships 

Jubilee
Jubilee